, is a Japanese manga artist, novelist, an author of instructional comics, and a racing writer. Sugaya wrote and illustrated Game Center Arashi, a manga series based on video games. He also drew a manga tied to the Japanese Spider-Man television series from the 1970s and also drew the manga adaptations of all Kamen Rider series from Ichigo to Stronger.

External links
 Mitsuru Sugaya Homepage (English)
 Mitsuru Sugaya Homepage (Japanese)

Manga artists from Shizuoka Prefecture
Japanese writers
1950 births
Living people